Hamilton/Wenham is an MBTA Commuter Rail station in Hamilton and Wenham, Massachusetts. It serves the Newburyport Branch of the Newburyport/Rockport Line. It is located just south of the intersection of Bay Road (MA Route 1A) and Walnut Road, and straddles the Hamilton–Wenham town line, with the southern end of the platform geographically in Wenham.

History

Service to the Hamilton/Wenham area began on December 18, 1839 when the Eastern Railroad was extended through the station on its way to Portsmouth, New Hampshire. The station has seen continuous service ever since. By the early 20th century, the station was used as a turnback point for some trains, and it remained so for decades. The town of Hamilton purchased the station in the early 1960s and demolished it to make room for a parking lot. The former freight house was converted to a taxi stand and waiting room.

When the newly formed MBTA began subsidizing commuter rail service in 1965, Hamilton was the outer limit of the MBTA funding district. On January 18, 1965, most Boston and Maine Railroad commuter services outside the MBTA district - except for a handful of locally subsidized trips - were discontinued. Hamilton-Wenham became the outer terminus for 21 round trips to Boston; the only service beyond was a single Newburyport round trip, subsidized by Newburyport and Rowley. Until 1971, some rush hour trips of the route  bus (itself transferred from the Eastern Massachusetts Street Railway to the MBTA in 1970) served Hamilton/Wenham.

The 1862-built freight house burned down in late 2000. The former depot building (which had been destroyed by vandals by 1977) and platform were located on the west side of the single track. The accessible mini-high platform was adjacent to the Route 1A crossing, causing the road to be blocked whenever a train was in the station. The new platform opened on July 10, 2002. The former platform was removed soon afterwards.

Branches

Two branches were built from the station in the 1870s. It never saw regularly scheduled passenger service, but instead was used for special summer-only trains to the camp. A parallel trolley line was constructed in 1894, vastly reducing demand for the branch line. In 1896, Willow Street (which crossed the branch near the station, and was used by the trolley line) became a public street. The state legislature refused to approve a grade crossing, which were very controversial at the time. The B&M, hardly interested in the non-longer-profitable branch, abandoned it in 1901.

The line originally had four stations: Miles River (at Bridge Street), Woodbury (at Essex Street), Essex Falls (at Apple Street), Essex (at Shepard Drive). 
The Interstate Commerce Commission denied the B&M's 1926 request to abandon the branch, but allowed closure of the Essex - Conomo section in 1927. The remainder had limited commuter service; most traffic was wood for shipbuilding and ice from Chebacco Lake. The Great Depression destroyed the shipbuilding demand, and the advent of electric refrigerators eliminated the need for natural ice. The B&M applied for abandonment in August 1942; the request was approved that November, and the rails were removed in December 1942 as scrap steel for the war effort. Only the Conomo depot, now a private residence, remains extant.

References

External links

MBTA - Hamilton/Wenham

MBTA Commuter Rail stations in Essex County, Massachusetts
Stations along Boston and Maine Railroad lines
Railway stations in the United States opened in 1839